Jimmy James Bailey Hinds (born 7 February 1954) is a former Honduran football forward who played for Honduras during the 1981 CONCACAF Championship qualification.

Club career
Nicknamed El Socio, Bailey played for Real España for whom he scored 52 goals in 191 caps between 1973 and 1985. He and his brother Roberto Bailey share a record with the Palacios brothers, the sole families to have scored in more than one League final.

Personal life
Jimmy James Bailey lives in San Pedro Sula.

References

1954 births
Living people
People from Tela
Association football forwards
Honduran footballers
Honduras international footballers
Real C.D. España players
Liga Nacional de Fútbol Profesional de Honduras players